Bhuvneshwari Kumari is a former women's squash champion from India. She is recipient of prestigious awards like Padma Shri and Arjuna Award. She is also a record holder of Guinness Book of World Records by being National champion 16 times in a row. She belongs to the former royal family of  Alwar.

Early life 
Kumari, also known as Princess Candy, was born at New Delhi on 1st September 1960 to Yashwant Singh and Brinda Kumari. She is the granddaughter of Maharaja Tej Singh Prabhakar Bahadur of Alwar. She has done her B.A. from St. Stephen's College of Delhi University.

Career 
She was Women's National Squash Champion for 16 years in a row from 1977 to 1992.

She is winner of 41 State titles and two International titles (Kenyan Open 1988 and 1989).

She was awarded the Arjuna Award in 1982 and the Padma Shri in 2001 for her achievements.

She is also the Coach for the Indian Women's Squash team along with Cyrus Poncha. They trained the team for Asian Games 2018 that were held in Jakarta, Indonesia.

Recognition 

Arjuna Award in 1982
Padma Shri in 2001
Delhi Sports Journalist Association Award (For The Best Sports Woman 1983)
Rajasthan Sports Award Council 1984
Maharana Mewar Foundation "Aravali Award" (For the most Outstanding Sportswoman of the year 1990)
K.K. Birla Foundation Award for Sports (For Outstanding Performance in 1991)
Bombay Sports Journalist Association Award (For Best Sportswoman for the year 1992)
Listed in the Limca Book of Records (For Sports Person of The Year 1992 and for The Most Number of Titles Won in Indian Sports)
Rajasthan Olympic Association Award -For Best Woman Player 1993–94
Maharaja Sawai Madho Singh Award for excellence in sports

References

Indian female squash players
Recipients of the Arjuna Award
Recipients of the Padma Shri in sports
Sportswomen from Rajasthan
Rajasthani people
1960 births
Living people
People from Alwar